Andrei Olhovskiy and Brett Steven were the defending champions but did not compete that year.

Nicklas Kulti and Mikael Tillström won in the final 3–6, 6–3, 7–6 against Marius Barnard and Brent Haygarth.

Seeds

Draw

References
 1998 St. Petersburg Open Doubles Draw

St. Petersburg Open
St. Petersburg Open
1998 in Russian tennis